Slow Burn is a narrative podcast produced by Slate Plus, a division of Slate. The first two seasons of the podcast are hosted by Leon Neyfakh; the third and sixth seasons of the show are hosted by Joel D. Anderson; and the fourth and fifth seasons are hosted by Josh Levin and Noreen Malone, respectively.

The first season is about the Watergate scandal featuring interviews with people involved in the story. The second is about the Impeachment of Bill Clinton featuring an interview with Linda Tripp, among others. The third season covers the growing tension between rappers Tupac Shakur and The Notorious B.I.G. in the 1990s. The fourth season covers the rise and fall of David Duke as a political figure in Louisiana in the 1980s and 1990s. Its fifth season explored the road to the Iraq war and debuted on April 21, 2021. The sixth season, beginning on November 3, 2021, covered the police beating of Rodney King and the subsequent L.A. riots. The seventh season was about Roe v. Wade and the politics of abortion in the 1970s. Its eighth season, to premiere in May 2023, will be about the nomination and confirmation of Clarence Thomas to the Supreme Court.

The podcast premiered on November 28, 2017 and became "one of the top shows on Apple Podcasts."

Seasons

 Season 1: Watergate (6 episodes)
 Season 2: Clinton–Lewinsky scandal (8 episodes)
 Season 3: Biggie and Tupac (9 episodes)
 Season 4: David Duke (6 episodes)
 Season 5: The Road to the Iraq War (8 episodes)
 Season 6: The L.A. Riots (8 episodes)
 Season 7: Roe v. Wade (4 episodes)
 Season 8: Clarence Thomas Supreme Court confirmation hearings

Reviews
Slow Burn received a positive review from Vulture. USA Today named Slow Burn as a "hot" recommended podcast. The New York Times praised Slow Burn and credited Malcolm Gladwell with leading the way by making historic podcasts that focused on neglected aspects of well-known events, like Slow Burn, possible.

Adaptations

TV adaptation 
It was announced in February 2019 that Epix was producing a six-part television series based on the first season Watergate investigation. It premiered on February 16, 2020.

Episodes

Additional series 
 Season 1 about the Watergate scandal was also adapted into another television series titled Gaslit on Starz
 Season 2 about Bill Clinton's impeachment was used to inform parts of the third season of American Crime Story on FX

See also 
List of history podcasts
 Political podcast

References

External links 
 

2017 podcast debuts
American podcasts
Audio podcasts
Podcasts adapted into television shows
Political podcasts
Works about the Watergate scandal
Documentary podcasts